Dynamic Herb–Borromeo Sports Complex, simply known as Dynamic Herb Sports Complex, is an association football stadium located in Talisay, Cebu. The stadium is home to Dynamic Herb Cebu, a professional football club playing in Philippines Football League.

History
Cebu is considered as one of the sport's hotbeds in the Philippines. The province, however, lacks top-quality sports facilities. The most prominent facilities are Cebu City Sports Center and Cebu Coliseum, both of which are either lacking in adequate facilities or are aging. The grounds and gymnasiums of colleges and universities within Metro Cebu have also been used as sports facilities.

Construction of the first phase of the complex began in October 2017, which focused on laying the astroturf for the football pitch and outdoor facilities. At least  was spent for the sports complex's football facility.

The facility sustained heavy damage due to Typhoon Rai (Odette), which hit Cebu in December 2021.

Facilities
The Dynamic Herb Sports Complex consists of a stadium with bleachers that can accommodate 550 people and a FIFA-standard artificial turf. There is a plan to build an indoor arena that would accommodate several sporting events like futsal, basketball, badminton, and volleyball.

References

Sports in Cebu
Football venues in the Philippines
2019 establishments in the Philippines
Buildings and structures in Cebu